Francisco Alexandre Stockinger (August 7, 1919 in Traun, Austria – April 12, 2009 in Porto Alegre, Brazil), also known as Chico Stockinger, was an Austrian artist and naturalized Brazilian. Stockinger is known as one of the main Brazilian modern sculptors, but was also an active printmaker, photographer, cartoonist, and graphic artist. Stockinger arrived in Brazil in 1921 and became a resident of São Paulo in 1929. Stockinger was chairman of the Francisco Lisboa Rio Grande do Sul Association for the Visual Arts (Associação Rio-Grandense de Artes Plásticas Francisco Lisboa) from 1957 to 1978.

References

External links
 Francisco Stockinger biography (in English)

1919 births
2009 deaths
People from Traun
Austrian emigrants to Brazil
Brazilian people of Austrian descent
Brazilian sculptors
Naturalized citizens of Brazil
20th-century sculptors